The Millingport Formation is a geologic formation in North Carolina. It preserves fossils dating back to the Ediacaran period.

See also

 List of fossiliferous stratigraphic units in North Carolina

References
 

Ediacaran geology of North Carolina